Turri il bandito is a 1950 Italian crime-drama film written and directed by Enzo Trapani.

Plot

Cast
Nino Crisman as Turri 
Lilia Landi
Ermanno Randi
Dody Ristori
Massimo Sallusti
Vittorio Sanipoli
Amedeo Trilli

References

External links
 

1950 films
1950s Italian-language films
Films set in Sicily
Films about the Sicilian Mafia
Italian black-and-white films
Italian crime drama films
1950 crime drama films
1950s Italian films